"Luv Ya" is a Pop/R&B song released by American-Australian Urban artist J-Wess in early 2004, from his album "J-Wess Presents Tha LP" (2004). "Luv Ya" also features vocals by Kulaia and MC Digga who both also appeared on J-Wess' previous singles "Bang This" and "What Chu Want". "Luv Ya" was released as the album's third and final single, and reached a peak position of number-fifteen on the Australian ARIA singles chart. It remained on the ARIA charts for a relatively short five weeks, and went uncertified. Unlike its predecessors, it failed to chart on the New Zealand RIANZ singles chart. In 2005 it was nominated for the MTV Australian Video Music Awards for Best R&B video.

Track listing
"Luv Ya"
"Luv Ya" (Remix Edit)
"Luv Ya" (Remix Extended)
"Luv Ya" (Video)
"What Chu Want" (Video)

Charts

References

2003 singles
2003 songs
Mushroom Records singles